Ernest Whitchurch (7 August 1891 – 2 December 1957) was an English professional footballer who played as a wing half.

References

1891 births
1957 deaths
Footballers from Sheffield
English footballers
Association football wing halves
Sharrow Reform F.C. players
Grimsby Town F.C. players
Rotherham Town F.C. (1899) players
Wombwell F.C. players
English Football League players